The European section of the 2026 FIFA World Cup qualification competition will act as qualifiers for the 2026 FIFA World Cup, to be held in Canada, Mexico and the United States, for national teams that are members of the Union of European Football Associations (UEFA). A total of 16 slots in the final tournament are available for UEFA teams.

Entrants
All 55 FIFA-affiliated national teams from UEFA are able to submit an entry into qualification. However, Russia were suspended indefinitely on 28 February 2022 from participating in UEFA and FIFA competitions due to their country's invasion of Ukraine. Therefore, it is unclear whether they will compete in the UEFA section of World Cup qualification.

 (suspended)

Format
A revised qualification format was confirmed by the UEFA Executive Committee during their meeting in Nyon, Switzerland, on 25 January 2023. As the number of final tournament slots for UEFA was increased from 13 to 16, the qualification format was modified from the previous cycle. The qualifying group stage will feature twelve groups of four or five teams. The winner of each group will qualify for the World Cup finals, while the second-placed teams will either qualify directly or participate in play-off matches.

Schedule
Below is the schedule of the European qualifiers for the 2026 FIFA World Cup. Teams drawn into groups of five will play their first matches in March 2025, or June 2025 if they are participating in the quarter-finals or promotion/relegation play-offs of the 2024–25 UEFA Nations League. Teams drawn into groups of four will play their first matches in September 2025. No announcement has been made on whether play-offs will be played after the group stage.

References

External links

European Qualifiers, UEFA.com

Uefa
2026
2024–25 in UEFA football
2025–26 in UEFA football
March 2025 sports events in Europe
June 2025 sports events in Europe
September 2025 sports events in Europe
October 2025 sports events in Europe
November 2025 sports events in Europe